Pyroteuthidae (the fire squids) is a family of squids. The family comprises two genera. Species are diurnally mesopelagic, migrating into surface waters during the night. The family is characterised by the tentacles, which have a permanent constriction and bend near the base; and photophores occurring on the tentacles, eyeballs, and viscera. Members reach mantle lengths of 23–50 mm. Paralarvae of the family are common around the Hawaiian Islands, with up to 17% of collected specimens in the area belonging to Pyroteuthidae.

Species
Genus Pterygioteuthis
Pterygioteuthis gemmata
Pterygioteuthis giardi, roundear enope squid
Pterygioteuthis hoylei
Pterygioteuthis microlampas
Genus Pyroteuthis
Pyroteuthis addolux
Pyroteuthis margaritifera, jewel enope squid
Pyroteuthis serrata

References

External links

Tree of Life web project: Pyroteuthidae

Squid